How to Stay Married is an Australian television comedy series screening on Network 10. It premiered on 8 November 2018. The series is a spin-off of an episode of the 2013 anthology comedy series It's a Date on the ABC. The show is a Princess Pictures and Pablo Pictures co-production.

The show was renewed for a second season on 22 August 2018, before the first episode aired. All episodes of season 2 were initially released on streaming service 10 Play on March 26, 2020 for two weeks as part of Network Ten's "10 Shows in 10 Days" promotion during the COVID-19 pandemic. It later premiered on Network Ten on Tuesday, 5 May 2020. A third season premiered on May 4, 2021.

Synopsis

After fifteen years of marriage, the lives of Greg and Em Butler and their two daughters change when Em returns to work, Greg is made redundant and his brother Brad moves in.

Cast

Main Cast

Recurring Cast

Main characters

Episodes

Series overview

Season 1 (2018)

Season 2 (2020)

Season 3 (2021)

References

External links

2018 Australian television series debuts
2010s Australian comedy television series
Australian comedy television series
Television shows set in Melbourne
Network 10 original programming